Federal Highway 127 (Carretera Federal 127) is a Federal Highway of Mexico. Federal Highway 127 is split into two segments: the first segment travels from Pánuco, Veracruz in the north to Tihuatlán in the south. The second segment travels from Poza Rica in the north to Martínez de la Torre in the south.

References

127